Wild West is the debut mixtape by British rapper Central Cee. It was released independently on 12 March 2021.

Critical reception 

Elle Evans of Clash described Central Cee as a "soon-to-be rap-star" and stated that the mixtape "handed over a slew of top-notch tracks", while NME critic Nicolas-Tyrell Scott said that Wild West gives "a tantalising glimpse at drill's future". Will Pritchard of The Guardian opined that Cee is a "golden egg in the UK's blossoming drill scene", and described the mixtape as "punchy".

Commercial performance 
Wild West debuted at number two on the UK Albums Chart, earning 15,105 album-equivalent units in its first week, of which 6,302 copies were in physical CD format. It was also the most streamed album of the week. The mixtape also charted in Ireland, where it peaked at number three, and Australia, where it debuted and peaked at number 37 on the ARIA Albums Chart.
As of September 2021, the album has successfully reached 98,000 in sales.

Track listing

Charts

Weekly charts

Year-end charts

Certifications

References 

2021 debut albums
2021 mixtape albums
Central Cee albums
Self-released albums
Debut mixtape albums